This is a list of broadcast television stations that are licensed in the U.S. state of South Dakota.

Full-power stations
VC refers to the station's PSIP virtual channel. RF refers to the station's physical RF channel.

Defunct full-power stations
Channel 5: KDSJ-TV - satellite of KRSD-TV - Lead (1/1960-2/29/1976)
Channel 7: KRSD-TV - NBC/ABC - Rapid City (1/22/1958-2/29/1976)
Channel 9: KABY-TV - ABC - Aberdeen (11/27/1958-4/6/2018)

LPTV stations

Translators

South Dakota

Television stations